Saint-Cléophas-de-Brandon is a municipality in D'Autray Regional County Municipality in the Lanaudière region of Quebec, Canada. Before 1997 it was known simply as Saint-Cléophas.

History
In 1897, the Parish of Saint-Cléophas was formed when it separated from the parish of Saint-Félix-de-Valois. It seems that the name of Saint Cléophas was suggested by Édouard-Charles Fabre (1827-1896), archbishop of Montreal, to honour Cléophas Beausoleil (1845-1904), who was House of Commons member for Berthier from 1887 to 1899. That same year, its post office opened and a year later the Parish Municipality of Saint-Cléophas was established.

In 1997, the parish municipality changed status to municipality and changed its name to Saint-Cléophas-de-Brandon in order to distinguish it from a namesake municipality in the Bas-Saint-Laurent region. The "Brandon" part refers to the geographic township of Brandon within which it is located.

Geography
Inserted between Saint-Gabriel-de-Brandon to the north and Saint-Norbert to the east, between the edge of the Laurentians and Saint-Félix-de-Valois, along the Bayonne River, Saint-Cléophas-de-Brandon is characterized by a landscape of hills and plains.

Demographics
Population trend:
 Population in 2021: 254 (2016 to 2021 population change: 11.9%)
 Population in 2016: 227 
 Population in 2011: 276 
 Population in 2006: 284
 Population in 2001: 285
 Population in 1996: 283
 Population in 1991: 262

Private dwellings occupied by usual residents: 105 (total dwellings: 112)

Mother tongue:
 English as first language: 0%
 French as first language: 100%
 English and French as first language: 0%
 Other as first language: 0%

Education

The Sir Wilfrid Laurier School Board operates anglophone public schools, including:
 Joliette Elementary School in Saint-Charles-Borromée
 Joliette High School in Joliette

See also
List of municipalities in Quebec

References

External links
Saint-Cléophas-de-Brandon - MRC d'Autray

Incorporated places in Lanaudière
Municipalities in Quebec